"I Wanna Go On You" is a single by television personality Keith Lemon. It debuted at No. 52 on the UK Singles Chart. Profits from it go towards Text Santa. Said Lemon of the song:

Music video
A music video, starring Keith, Gareth Gates and Billy Ocean, was produced.

Charts

References

2013 singles
2013 songs